This is a list of the brightest stars together with record holders of other categories with many details in compact form that can be compared. The brightest stars are completely listed until apparent magnitude of 2 including Polaris. Some record holders, like the nearest star, the largest star, the most luminous star in the Milky Way etc. are added to the list.
The main purpose for this list is the possibility to compare stars of different categories, like to compare the most luminous known star R136a1 with the brightest star of our sky Sirius, which is not possible with the existing lists in Lists of stars. 

For multiple values from different sources the average value is displayed. From binary star systems the brighter (A) star is considered except for magnitude and luminosity, where it is combined. More Properties (e.g. Temperature, Age) will be added. Data is yet to be added, verified and corrected.

References 

brightest
brightest